This is a list of mountain passes of Nepal.

Notable mountain passes

References 

Nepal
 
Mountains